The 2023 Korean Tour will be the 13th season of the Korean Tour in which Official World Golf Ranking points will be awarded.

The season marked the inaugural edition of the Korea Championship, an event co-sanctioned with the European Tour.

Schedule
The following table lists official events during the 2023 season.

Notes

References

External links

2023 Korean Tour
2023 in golf
2023 in South Korean sport